Bridget Tolley (born 1960) is a Canada-based Algonquin community worker, women activist and the founder of Families of Sisters in Spirit (FSIS).

Tolley was born on 1960 at Maniwaki, Quebec. She is an Algonquin, born to Gladys and John Tolley. Her father committed suicide when she was 11 years old. Her mother was killed in a car accident on 5 October 2001 by Quebec Provincial Police, which made Tolley a woman activist.

Bridget Tolley is the founders of FSIS (Families of Sisters in Spirit). She is a founding member of Justice for Victims of Police Killings and also involved with Native Women's Association of Canada Sisters in Spirit Vigils. Tolley is active in other social issues such as child welfare, police violence, indigenous education, and housing.

References 

1960 births
Living people
Canadian women activists
Canadian activists
Algonquin people
People from Maniwaki